You're Stronger Than You Know is the fifth studio album by English singer-songwriter James Morrison. It was released by Stanley Park Records on 8 March 2019.

Critical reception

AllMusic editor Neil Z. Yeung rated the album three and a half out of five stars. He found that "While much of the first half of the album is designed to spark warm fuzzies and butterflies, Morrison doesn't shy away from the messy, uncertain moments of life [...] Taking the wisdom from lessons learned in his hitherto thirtysomething years on Earth, Morrison pushes positivity and maturity with this simple and utterly relatable collection."

Track listing

Charts

References

2019 albums
James Morrison (singer) albums